UFC 103: Franklin vs. Belfort was a mixed martial arts event held by the Ultimate Fighting Championship (UFC) on September 19, 2009 in Dallas, Texas at the American Airlines Center. The event was  broadcast on pay-per-view.

Background
This was the first UFC event to air a portion of the preliminary card live and commercial-free during an hour long block on Spike. The Efrain Escudero vs. Cole Miller, Drew McFedries vs. Tomasz Drwal, Rick Story vs. Brian Foster, and the Jim Miller vs. Steve Lopez fights were shown on Spike.

As a part of the UFC/ESPN UK regionalization strategy the bout of Paul Daley vs. Brian Foster was to air on ESPN (UK) prior to Daley replacing Mike Swick against Martin Kampmann.

The event was aired the same time Floyd Mayweather fought Juan Manuel Márquez. Mayweather/Márquez drew a smaller crowd (13,116) but its gate was considerably higher at $6,811,300. It also sold more PPV buys (1,000,000).

To date, this PPV had the largest amount of fights broadcast by the UFC (13).

It was announced on July 20, 2009 that Rich Franklin would headline UFC 103 against Dan Henderson. It was then announced on July 31, 2009 that fans were not happy with the announced headliner of Henderson-Franklin 2 so they changed the main event to feature Rich Franklin vs. Vitor Belfort. "Fans didn't like it, so we changed it," UFC President Dana White said.

A previously announced bout featuring Steve Steinbeiss was moved to UFC Fight Night: Diaz vs. Guillard. A previously announced bout featuring Aaron Simpson was moved to UFC 102.

A knee injury forced Matt Wiman out of a bout with Rafael dos Anjos on July 23. Rob Emerson filled in.

A knee injury forced Thiago Tavares out of his bout with Jim Miller on August 20. Tavares was replaced by UFC newcomer Steve Lopez.

A back injury forced Dan Lauzon out of his bout with Rafaello Oliveira and he was replaced by Nik Lentz.

An injury forced Mike Swick out of his bout with Martin Kampmann and Paul Daley moved up from the undercard to face Kampmann.

Results

Bonus awards
Fighters were awarded $65,000 bonuses.

Fight of the Night: Rick Story vs. Brian Foster
Knockout of the Night: Vitor Belfort
Submission of the Night: Rick Story

See also
 Ultimate Fighting Championship
 List of UFC champions
 List of UFC events
 2009 in UFC

References

Ultimate Fighting Championship events
2009 in mixed martial arts
Mixed martial arts in Dallas
Sports competitions in Dallas
2009 in sports in Texas